The Ciorman is a left tributary of the river Dobra in Romania. It flows into the Dobra near Bătrâna.

References

Rivers of Romania
Rivers of Hunedoara County